Yuantouzhu is a peninsula which lies on the northwestern shore of Lake Tai, near Wuxi in China's Jiangsu province. It was established as a park in 1916 and celebrated its centennial in 2016.

Yuantouzhu, or "Turtle Head Isle" in English (so called because its shape resembles a turtle's head), is a popular scenic tourist region. Tourist ferries leave from Yuantouzhu to the Sanshan Islands, which were opened to tourists in the mid-1980s. Seagulls follow the boat and like to be fed by tourists on boat.

The Yuantouzhu park is famous for its tourism especially during the spring season from March to April when hundreds of cherry blossom trees start to bloom.   Two gates are open for tourists which are Chongshan gate and Dushan main gate. During the season, there are also at least eight ancient fishing sailboats in the lake.

References

Gallery

External links
Official website 

Peninsulas of China
Landforms of Jiangsu
Tourist attractions in Jiangsu